Brimah Kebbie (born ) is an English former rugby league and rugby union footballer who played in the 1980s and 1990s, and current rugby union coach.

During the 1989–90 season, Brimah Kebbie was an interchange/substitute for defending champions Widnes in the 30-18 victory over the visiting Canberra Raiders in the 1989 World Club Challenge at Old Trafford, Manchester on Wednesday 4 October 1989.

Brimah Kebbie played for Bradford Northern when they finished as runners-up to Wigan in the Championship during the 1993–94 season.

Personal life
Brimah Kebbie is the father of the (soccer) association footballer; Elliot Kebbie.

References

External links
Statistics at rugby.widnes.tv 
Profile at saints.org.uk
Photograph - Brimah-Kebbie at huddersfieldrlheritage.co.uk
Rugby Union: Saracens a league apart
Rugby Union Statistics at rugby.statbunker.com
New coach set to inspire London Nigerians
2nd XV put Medway back in line
Imperial dissect the Medics in clinical fashion
(archived by web.archive.org) I would like to welcome our new addition to the club (Hillingdon Abbots RFC/Old Abbotstonians RFC) Brimah Kebbie

1965 births
Living people
Bradford Bulls players
English rugby league players
English rugby union coaches
English rugby union players
Footballers who switched code
Rugby union players from Lambeth
Huddersfield Giants players
Rugby league wingers
Rugby union wings
Saracens F.C. players
St Helens R.F.C. players
Widnes Vikings players